= Vaddanam =

South Indian ornamental belt

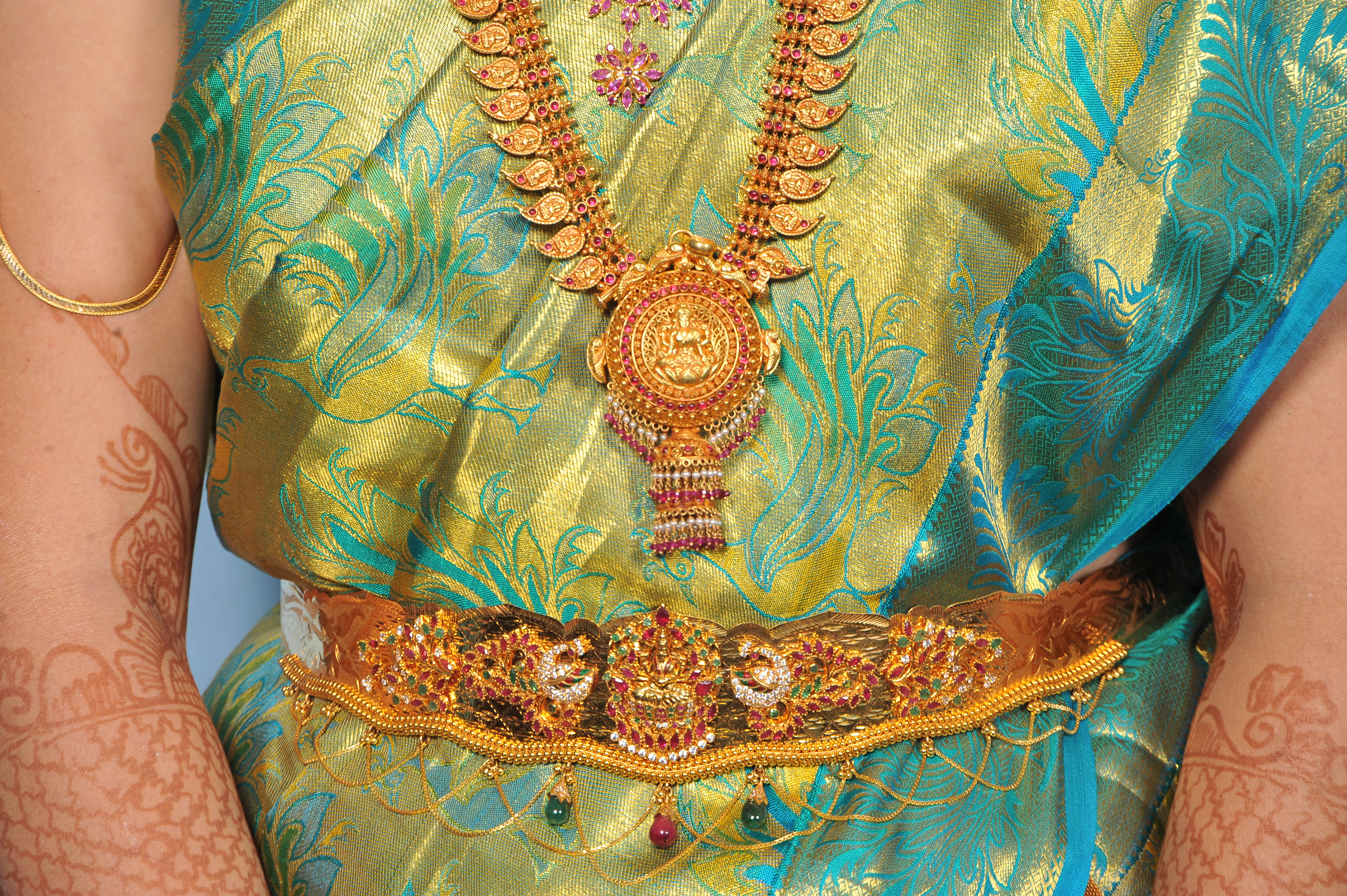
A Telugu bride wearing Vaddanam and a long necklace

Vaddanam is a gold ornamental belt worn by South Indian women on special occasions.

These occasions can include festival days, major family occasions, and weddings. like marriages as a status symbol in South India. A Vaddanam is one of the heaviest ornaments worn by a bride. A South Indian marriage is rarely seen without the bride wearing one.
